Masur is a small town in the Satara district of Maharashtra in India. It is located between Satara and Karad, seven kilometers from National Highway No. 4. Masur is located at a distance of  14 km from Karad. The nearest Masur railway station is about 2 km away from town. It has a population of about 18,000.It is a marketplace for nearby 20 villages.

Tourism
It is a famous religious tourist spot. It is notable as the site of one of the Maruti eleven temples built by the Hindu saint, Ramdas.It was also birthplace of  Varakari saint Yogiraj Hare Krishana Baba. The Masurashram was situated in Masur, where Dharmabhaskar Vinayak Maharaj and Kaka Joshi gave lessons on the Dasbodh and Manache Shlok of Ramdas. Dr. Jyeshthraj B. Joshi, son of Bhalachandra(Kaka) Joshi, is a world-renowned senior scientist, celebrated chemical engineer, innovator, teacher par excellence and winner of the Shanti Swarup Bhatnagar award (1991)and Padmabhushan award in the year 2014.

Masur is also famous for the 101 years old Shree Sachadev Sumatinath Jain Mandir. This temple was made 101years ago by the jain community in the Masur. Idols in the temple was made by Mourya Samrat Samprati Raja in c. 224 – c. 215 BCE. Masur was famous for the Vyapari Peth near the jain temple.

History
Masur was one of the most important towns during Chatrapati Shivaji Maharaj's rule and it has a fort from that time called 'Bhuikot Killa.'
Jagadale a Prominent Maratha clan was holding the sardeshmukhi of this villagefrom bahamani era. Chatrapat Shivaji maharaj cancelled Deshmukhi and jagdale became Patil of village. Jagdales took part in third battle of panipat

Ganesh festival of Masur is very famous celebrated at Jagdale Patil wada. Temple of Bhairoba is one of the notable places in Masur.

The festival of Bhairvnath is celebrated during Maghi Pornima( Fullmoon) in February. This festival is held for about 15 days. Masur is famous for Ganesh Yatra held on the next day of Anatchaturdashi. Biroba Yatra, celebrated by all dhangar castes, is also famous in Masur.

Hanbarwadi (6 km away from Masur Population: 2000 approx) is one of the small but famous villages in Masur. It is well known for the Vitthal temple built by famous Mauli Baba(saint). Vitthal mandir is famous for Akhanda Veena which means the instrument was not kept down form last 101 years and has been played by the vitthal bhakts from Hanbarwadi till date. People celebrate the Harinam Saptaha (in the memory of Mauli Baba) in the Vitthal Mandir for a week after Karthiki Ekadashi.

Dr. B.R.Ambedkar writes about his childhood experience in Masur and the discrimination he and his siblings suffered,  in his autobiographical book, Waiting for a Visa (chapter 1).

See also 
 Maruti Temples, Maharashtra
JAIN TEMPLE MASUR
https://goo.gl/maps/dHRk67sXfdZoL2k57

References 

2.http://www.udctalumni.org.in/newsroom/news/300.dz
 3.https://www.youtube.com/watch?v=uGzMlqiwkKo
 4.https://www.youtube.com/watch?v=6haQlhyCtfc
 5.yogirajharekrishnababa.in/गुरुपरंपरा.php
 6.Md Pathak, "11 maruti Temples " blogspot 5 Jan 2010
 7.Lutgendorf, Philip (2007). Hanuman's tale: the messages of a divine monkey. US: Oxford University Press. p. 74. .
 8.https://www.youtube.com/watch?v=0qzkCqTEt0Q

Cities and towns in Satara district